Vance is an unincorporated community in Hampshire County in the U.S. state of West Virginia. Vance lies on the South Branch Potomac River. Most of its residents reside along West Virginia Route 28. Buffalo Creek empties into the South Branch at Vance.

Historic site 
Fort Forman site, State Route 28

References 

Unincorporated communities in Hampshire County, West Virginia
Populated places on the South Branch Potomac River
Unincorporated communities in West Virginia